Louis Barillet (1880 – 1948) was a French artist, known for his work in stained glass.  Among those with whom he collaborated were Théodore-Gérard Hanssen and Jacques Le Chevallier.  His windows may be seen in the church of Notre-Dame-des-Missions-du-cygne d'Enghien.

References

French stained glass artists and manufacturers
People from Alençon
1880 births
1948 deaths